Strawberry Lane is a Philippine television drama series broadcast by GMA Network. Directed by Don Michael Perez, it stars Bea Binene, Joyce Ching, Kim Rodriguez and Jhoana Marie Tan. It premiered on September 15, 2014 on the network's Telebabad line up replacing Niño. The series concluded on January 2, 2015 with a total of 80 episodes. It was replaced by Once Upon a Kiss in its timeslot.

The series is streaming online on YouTube.

Premise
The story focuses on the lives of Clarissa, Jack, Dorina and Lupe who are in Bagong Bahay Pangarap, a reformation center for girls. Despite having different personalities, they share the same hope of fulfilling their dreams.

Cast and characters

Lead cast
 Bea Binene as Clarissa Tolentino Morales-Valentino
 Kim Rodriguez as Jacqueline "Jack" Perez-Dizon
 Joyce Ching as Dorina Tolentino Morales / Amelia "Amy" Tolentino Morales / Dory Peralta
 Jhoana Marie Tan as Guadalupe "Lupe" Delgado-Bustamante

Supporting cast
 Jake Vargas as Gabriel "Gabo" Valentino
 Kiko Estrada as Paulino "Paul" Dizon
 Jeric Gonzales as George Bustamante
 Rita De Guzman as Lavinia Tolentino Bernarte
 Sunshine Dizon as Elena "Elaine" Tolentino-Morales
 Sheryl Cruz as Monique Tolentino-Bernarte
 Christian Bautista as Richard "Rich" Tolentino
 TJ Trinidad as Jonathan "Jun" Morales
 Chanda Romero as Digna Castro
 Boots Anson-Roa as Stella Tolentino

Recurring cast
 Marky Lopez as Carlyn
 Shelly Hipolito as April Jaymalin
 Tessie Tomas as Margaret Jaymalin
 Nicole Dulalia as Chloe
 Sherilyn Reyes-Tan as Marga Valentino
 Diego Castro as Mario 
 Djanin Cruz as Loisa
 Ar Angel Aviles as Kachuchay

Guest cast
 Lani Mercado as Maring Javier
 Tanya Garcia as Myrna Javier / Sarah Jaymalin
 Raymond Bagatsing as Hector Rosales
 Tina Paner as Salve "Marcela" Rosales
 Jan Marini as Rebecca "Bebs" Rosales
 Dang Cruz as Esther
 Weng Fernando as Syl
 Rosemarie Sarita as Luiza
 Ashley Cabrera as young Dorina
 Milkcah Wynne Nacion as young Clarissa
 James Wright as Gil Villa
 Jenine Desiderio as Madame Villa
 Jay Manalo as Christopher "Chris" Bernarte
 Aicelle Santos as Lani Delgado
 Gino Padilla as Mr. Bustamante
Caprice Cayetano as Dorina's sister
 Carme Sanchez as Dorina's grandmother
 Ynez Veneracion as Dolores
 Art Acuña as Delphin
 Katya Santos as Helena 
 Charee Pineda as Marieta

Ratings
According to AGB Nielsen Philippines' Mega Manila household television ratings, the pilot episode of Strawberry Lane earned a 28.2% rating which is the series' highest rating. While the final episode scored a 22.7% rating.

Accolades

References

External links
 
 

2014 Philippine television series debuts
2015 Philippine television series endings
Filipino-language television shows
GMA Network drama series
Television shows set in the Philippines